The 1924 Wisconsin Badgers football team was an American football team that represented the University of Wisconsin in the 1924 Big Ten Conference football season. The team compiled a 2–3–3 record (0–2–2 against conference opponents), finished in last place in the Big Ten Conference, and was outscored by opponents by a combined total of 94 to 66. John J. Ryan was in his second year as Wisconsin's head coach.

Jack Harris was the team captain. Guard Adolph Bieberstein was selected by All-Sports Magazine as a third-team player on its 1924 College Football All-America Team.

The team played its home games at Camp Randall Stadium, which had a seating capacity of 14,000. During the 1924 season, the average attendance at home games was 14,592.

Schedule

References

Wisconsin
Wisconsin Badgers football seasons
Wisconsin Badgers football